Erigeron pulcherrimus is a North American species of flowering plant in the family Asteraceae known by the common name basin fleabane. The species grows in the western United States in the eastern part of the Intermountain Region west of the Rocky Mountains. It has been found in Wyoming, Colorado, Utah, New Mexico, and Arizona.

Erigeron pulcherrimus is a perennial herb up to 35 centimeters (14 inches) tall, producing a large taproot. The plant generally produces only 1 flower head per stem. Each head has 25–60 blue, pink or white ray florets surrounding numerous yellow disc florets. The species grows in dry places with silty or gravelly soil, sometimes high in salt, selenium, or gypsum.

References

External links
Photo of herbarium specimen at Missouri Botanical Garden, collected in New Mexico in 1897, isotype of ''Erigeron pulcherrimus'

pulcherrimus
Flora of the Western United States
Flora of the Rocky Mountains
Taxa named by Amos Arthur Heller
Plants described in 1898
Flora without expected TNC conservation status